Sir Edmund Butler, 2nd Baronet (died before 1653), of Cloughgrenan (townland near Carlow), was the son of Sir Thomas Butler, 1st Baronet and Anne Colclough. He was admitted to Lincoln's Inn on 5 June 1637. He succeeded to the title after 1639. He died intestate and his estate was administered to his widow in 1653.

Marriage and issue
He married Juliana Hyde, the daughter of Bernard Hyde. Their children were:
 Eleanor Butler
 Sir Thomas Butler, 3rd Baronet (died between Jan 1703 - Feb 1703)
 James Butler

See also
 Butler dynasty

References

17th-century Irish people
Edmund
People from County Carlow
Butler baronets, of Cloughgrenan
Baronets in the Baronetage of Ireland